The Lutheran Student Movement - United States of America (LSM-USA) is a student-led organization of Lutheran college students. The movement's staff and resources are housed at the Churchwide Office of the Evangelical Lutheran Church in America in Chicago, Illinois.

History
LSM-USA was founded when two Lutheran college organizations, the Lutheran Student Association of America (LSAA, founded in 1922) and Gamma Delta (founded in 1928), merged in 1969 while gathered in convention in Boulder, Colorado. LSM-USA assumed LSAA's position in the World Student Christian Federation.

Since its inception, LSM-USA has maintained the idea of being a pan-Lutheran organization. Until 1985, LSM-USA was supported and sponsored by the American Lutheran Church (ALC), the Lutheran Church in America (LCA), the Association of Evangelical Lutheran Churches (AELC), and the Lutheran Church–Missouri Synod (LCMS).

In 1984 the organization Lutherans Concerned/North America (LC/NA) began the Reconciling in Christ movement. This movement seeks Lutheran bodies that declare themselves accepting and affirming of all members of the body of Christ, regardless of ethnicity, age, or sexuality. LSM-USA became the first Lutheran organization to declare itself as Reconciling in Christ. As a result, the LCMS withdrew its support for LSM-USA in 1985, citing LSM-USA's decision to declare itself a Reconciling in Christ organization as well as other doctrinal disagreements. The LCMS then formed its own organization, the Lutheran Student Fellowship.

In 1988 the ALC, the LCA, and the AELC merged to form the Evangelical Lutheran Church in America (ELCA), thus reducing the number of sponsoring bodies to one. However, LSM-USA remains open to all Lutherans.

In 2004 LSM-USA entered into a full ministry partnership with Lutheran Youth Encounter.

In 2007 LSM-USA began formal discussion of entering into a full-partnership with the ELCA. In 2009, the Legislative Assembly voted to pursue a formal partnership with the ELCA, so long as it retained its student-led structure and its Reconciling in Christ status. Additionally, at the 2008-2009 gathering, the assembly moved to change the Secretary of International and Multicultural Concerns position into a new position called the Advocate for Diversity and Service Learning.

Structure
LSM-USA is a self-governing student organization within the Evangelical Lutheran Church of America. A National Council, made up of sixteen elected voting members and five non-voting members, meets throughout year to oversee organizational business and allow for National Council members to support one another in their ministry. The Council consists of the President; the Vice President, who also serves as the LSM-USA liaison to the ELCA's Lutheran Youth Organization (LYO); the Advocate for Diversity and Service Learning; an intern, a non-voting member who is paid for by the ELCA; presidents of the thirteen different regions; a web specialist; a liaison from the board of the LYO; and a national staff advisor, usually the campus minister of a university-based Lutheran campus ministry.

Decision-making authority rests first with the body of LSM-USA gathered annually in plenary sessions at the National Gathering; then with the National Council when it gathers in session twice annually; and finally with the three national officers in between those meetings. National officers are elected at the National Gathering by all present voting members, while regional officers are elected individually by their regions at different points throughout the year. All elected members of the National Council serve one-year calendar year terms. Other work of the organization is often done through specially designated ad hoc committees that are filled by students and campus ministry advisors who are selected through an application process involving review by the National Officers, and who report to the National Council, from which they derive their constitutional authority.

Regional breakdown

ALTO - Arkansas, Louisiana, Texas, Oklahoma
Blue Ridge - North Carolina, Tennessee, Virginia
Central - Kansas, Missouri, Nebraska
Desert Southwest - Arizona, New Mexico, Western Texas, Southwest Colorado, and south Nevada
Gulf Atlantic (GALSM) - Alabama, Florida, Georgia, Mississippi, South Carolina
IMOK - Indiana, Michigan, Ohio, Kentucky
Mid-Atlantic (MALSM) - Delaware, Maryland, New Jersey, Pennsylvania, West Virginia, and the District of Columbia
Northeast (NELSM) - Connecticut, Maine, Massachusetts, New Hampshire, New York, Rhode Island, Vermont
Pacific Northwest (PAC-NW) - Alaska, Idaho, Montana, Oregon, Washington
Pacific Southwest (PAC-SW) - California, Hawaii, Nevada
Rocky Mountain (RMR) - Colorado, Utah, Wyoming
Tri-Ota - Minnesota, North Dakota, South Dakota
Central Midwest - Illinois, Iowa, Wisconsin, and the upper peninsula of Michigan

National Council
The 2010 National Council consisted of the following National Officers:
President - Smith Heavner, Tri-County Technical College
Vice-President - Emily Miller, University of North Carolina
Advocate for Diversity and Service-Learning - Katie Gorin, Arizona State University

National Gathering
The National Gathering is held once a year, at a pre-determined location, over New Year's Day. Gatherings have been held in Chicago; New Orleans; Phoenix; Washington, D.C.; Houston; San Diego; and Denver.

The national gathering is organized with the institutional and financial support of the ELCA because of the inability of an organization of college students such as LSM-USA to effectively negotiate with hotels and other vendors in the necessary ways. Acknowledging this absolutely vital support, the gathering is convened by the ELCA and Lutheran Student Movement – USA under the authority of the National Council and is planned by a student committee with campus ministry advisers. Events at the gathering include worship, workshops, concerts, meals, dances, speakers, service projects, and plenary sessions.

Alternative spring break
In 2006 an annual alternative week-long spring break event, known as Breaking Out!, was instituted by LSM-USA. The event consists of service projects, theological education, social-ministry training, small group discussion, and community worship.

Breaking Out! was originally envisioned as three separate weeks for up to thirty students each. A challenge grant from Thrivent Financial for Lutherans provides financial support for students to participate in the program. The inaugural event was held in Atlanta, March 19–25, 2006.

The event is overseen by two committees of students: a planning committee, chaired by a student who participated in the previous year's event, and includes the president and intern of LSM as de facto members; and a fundraising committee, which is also chaired by a student from the previous year, and includes the secretary of LSM as a de facto member. These committees are responsible for planning the event and for selecting the participants from among the applicants. The planning committee generally does not accept more than two people from any single college or university.

Following the devastation of Hurricane Katrina in August 2005, the 2007 planning committee chose the town of Ocean Springs, Mississippi as the site for Breaking Out! 2007. The event was held March 11–16, 2007.

The 2008 event to be held in Washington, D.C. was canceled due to lack of participation.

In 2009 LSM-USA leadership began a partnership with Lutheran Disaster Response (LDR) and its current What a Relief program. This partnership emerged to become a new program called Alternative Spring Break 2009. LSM-USA provided funds and service-learning workbooks to campus ministries, while LDR organized the locations for relief efforts. The ELCA provided the majority of coordination efforts for this project.

In 2010 the ELCA decided to expand the Alternative Spring Break program to incorporate other ministries around the United States and abroad. LSM-USA was asked and decided to provide grants for student ministries to participate in a service-learning institute, which provided resources and time for discussion for leaders prior to their trips. These leaders were charged with disseminating the information from the institute to their students and leaders. The student group would then apply what they learned through the institute and on their trip.

References

External links
Official website
Youth Encounter

Lutheranism in the United States
Evangelical Lutheran Church in America
Christian organizations established in 1969
Student organizations established in 1969
Lutheran organizations established in the 20th century
Student religious organizations in the United States
Religious organizations based in Chicago
Fellowships